A hyclate is a pharmaceutical term for hydrochloride hemiethanolate hemihydrate (·HCl·EtOH·H2O), e.g. doxycycline hyclate.

References

Salts
Hydrates